Volker Lang is the name of among others the following Germans
 a leather designer from Aachen and his company
 an artist from Hamburg